Henry James Montague was the stage name of Henry John Mann, (January 20, 1843 – August 13, 1878), an American actor born in England.

Biography
Montague was born January 20, 1843, in Staffordshire, England.

After playing as an amateur he appeared at Astley's Theatre under Dion Boucicault, enacting on 26 January 1863, the Junior Counsel for the Defence in the 'Trial of Elfie Deans,' extracted by Boucicault from the 'Heart of Midlothian.' 
At the St James's Theatre on 11 January 1864, he appeared with Charles Mathews in the 'Adventures of a Love Letter,' an adaptation by Mathews of M. Sardou's 'Pattes de Mouche,' was Faust in Mr. Burnand's burlesque 'Faust and Marguerite,' 9 July, and 1 October, Christopher Larkins in 'Woodcock's Little Game.' 

On 29 June 1865 he was the original Launcelot Darrell, a murderer, in 'Eleanor's Victory,' adapted from Miss Braddon by John Oxenford ; at the Olympic, 9 December, the original Clement Austin in 'Henry Dunbar, or the Outcast,' adapted by Tom Taylor from 'L'Ouvriere de Londres,' itself founded by M. Hostein on Miss Braddon's novel ; on 25 April 1866 was the first Sir Charles Ormond in Leicester Silk Buckingham's ' Love's Martyrdom ;' and on 27 September 1866, the first Captain Trevor in Tom Taylor's 'Whiteboy.' 
On the production of Wilkie Collins's 'Frozen Deep,' 27 Oct. 1866, he was Frank Aldersley, and he played Mars in Mr. Burnand's burlesque 'Olympic Games' on 25 May 1867. 

Montague's first appearance at the Prince of Wales Theatre under the Bancroft management took place as Dick Heartley, an original part, in Boucicault's 'How she loves him,' 21 December 1867, and Frank Price in Robertson's 'Play' followed, 15 February 1868. 
At the Princess's, 12 Aug. 1868, he was the original Sir George Medhurst in 'After Dark,' an adaptation by Boucicault of 'Les Oiseaux de Proie' of D'Ennery and Grange. 
Back at the Prince of Wales's he was, 12 December 1868, the original Waverham in Mr. Edmund Yates's 'Tame Cats,' and on 16 January 1869 made his first distinct mark as Lord Beaufoy in Robertson's 'School.' 

In partnership with David James (died 1893) and Mr. Thomas Thorne, he opened the Vaudeville Theatre on 16 April 1870, speaking an address by Shirley Brooks, and playing George Anderson in Andrew Halliday's comedy 'For Love or Money.' 
In Albery's 'Two Roses,' 4 June 1870, he made a hit as Jack Wyatt to the Digby Grant of Mr. Henry Irving. 

In 1871, he seceded from the management, and became sole lessee of the Globe, opening 7 October 1871 with Henry James Byron's 'Partners for Life,' in which he played Tom Gilroy, a young barrister. 
Here he played numerous original parts, among which were : Claude Redruth in Albery's 'Forgiven,' 9 March 1872; Walker in Byron's 'Spur of the Moment,' founded on Hooke's 'Gilbert Gurney,' 4 May 1872; Lord Chilton in Frank Marshall's 'False Shame,' 4 November 1872; Wilfrid Cumberledge in 'Tears, Idle Tears,' adapted by Mr. Clement Scott from the 'Marcel' of Jules Sandeau, 4 December 1872; King Raymond in Albery's 'Oriana,' 5 February 1873 ; Sir Henry Gaisford in Byron's 'Fine Feathers,' 26 April 1873; Toots in 'Heart's Delight,' adapted by Halliday from 'Dombey and Son,' 17 December 1873 ; and Alfred Trimble in 'Committed for Trial,' Mr. Gilbert's adaptation of 'Le Reveillon,' 24 January 1874. 
This was the last original character he played in England. 

He had also been seen in the 'Liar,' had played Max Harkaway in 'London Assurance,' Cyril in Byron's 'Cyril's Success,' Felix in Jerrold's 'Time works Wonders,' John Hawksley in 'Still Waters run deep' and Claude Melnotte in the 'Lady of Lyons'. He also gave dramatic readings at Hanover Square Rooms. 

He appeared in Thomas William Robertson comedies in London. In 1870 he was one of the founders of the Vaudeville Theatre with David James and Thomas Thorne. Lester Wallack brought him to the United States in 1874.

Montague was a founding member of The Lambs, an actors' club founded in London in 1869, and became its Shepherd (president) in 1873. He became the first Shepherd of The Lambs in New York City, in 1874.

He played the role of Captain Molineux in the premiere of The Shaughraun in 1874 and later appeared in Caste, Diplomacy, and The Overland Route. After Montague's death the role of Captain Molineux was taken up by Maurice Barrymore.

In 1875, Montague was sued by actress Rose Massey for breach of promise to marry. The case ended once Montague died.
He was in London in 1876, and assumed for a benefit, 27 July 1876, his original part of Jack Wyatt in 'Two Roses.' 

Montague subsequently returned to America, and died at The Palace Hotel in San Francisco, California on 11 August 1878 succumbing to pulmonary hemorrhage of the lungs brought a slight cold which had been aggravated by his journey. His last words to those around him being, "It's no use; I am going, boys. God bless you all." He had been playing the role of Lord Arthur Chilton in False Shame.

Despite a frequently expressed desire to be buried in England, he was laid to rest in Green-Wood Cemetery on August 21, 1878.

References

1878 deaths
1844 births
American male stage actors
English male stage actors
Burials at Green-Wood Cemetery
The Lambs presidents
Deaths from pulmonary hemorrhage
19th-century American male actors
Members of The Lambs Club